BBC Radio Somerset is the BBC's local radio station serving the county of Somerset.

It broadcasts on FM, AM, DAB, digital TV and via BBC Sounds from studios in the Blackbrook area of Taunton.

According to RAJAR, the station has a weekly audience of 55,000 listeners and a 3.9% share as of December 2022.

History
The first BBC service for the county of Somerset was established in 1978, as an emergency measure following storms in the county.

BBC Somerset Sound (1988–2007)
The station proper was launched as BBC Somerset Sound on 11 April 1988, broadcasting on BBC Radio Bristol's former frequency of 1323AM. It was based in studios above a cafe on Paul St, Taunton, with a smaller satellite studio in Yeovil. The signal on 1323AM was for many years interfered with by a Russian radio station.

In August 2002, BBC Somerset Sound moved to new premises in Park Street, Taunton, and acquired a more robust frequency of 1566AM.

BBC Somerset (2007–2020)
By 2007, the station was relaunched as BBC Somerset, with the launch of the BBC Somerset bus in May, and on 3 December of that year, the station was also given BBC Radio Bristol's former FM frequency of 95.5FM, and broadcasts to the whole of the historic county of Somerset and beyond. Listeners from as far afield as Finland have reported hearing the station clearly. BBC Somerset sometimes uses its AM frequency for cricket commentary while regular programming continues on FM. BBC Somerset began broadcasting in DAB in September 2014.

BBC Somerset was for many years an 'opt-out' from Radio Bristol, but in May 2012, the BBC established it as a station in its own right. The BBC's Annual Report and Accounts for 2005/2006 stated: "The BBC is committed to extending its network of local radio stations to a limited number of under served areas, and BBC management is carrying out preparatory work for new stations in Somerset, Dorset and Cheshire.".

On 6 October 2011, the BBC announced that it intended to close BBC Somerset's 1566MW frequency as part of its Delivering Quality First (DQF) program of cutbacks. No decision on the timing of the medium wave switch-off has yet been made.

In November 2017, BBC Somerset moved from the Park Street premises to a new building on the edge of Taunton in Blackbrook.

The current editor of BBC Somerset is Nick Bull, with Andrew Enever as news editor.

BBC Radio Somerset (2020–present)
On 27 April 2020 the station changed its name to BBC Radio Somerset in order to fit the station name in to the new jingle package.

On 5 July 2020, the station switched from the BBC West feed to join BBC South West.

BBC Somerset bus
BBC Somerset got a new mobile radio studio in the shape of a single-decker bus in May 2007. The role of the BBC Somerset bus across the county includes:

 To bring BBC Somerset out into local communities across the county
 To help to improve what people in county want from their local radio station, and from the BBC in general
 To promote the major BBC campaigns, such as the Reading and Writing project (RaW) and Springwatch and Autumnwatch among many others
 To feedback to the BBC any brickbats and bouquets – from listeners/viewers who might not usually have the chance to comment
 To broadcast live shows from towns and villages around Somerset

Programming for the bus, as well as the day-to-day operation and technical support was managed by Paul George.

In 2016, the bus became victim to cutbacks, and is no longer used by the station.

The Challenge

In 2007, BBC Somerset took part in an initiative to create the first carbon-zero radio station in the UK known as The Challenge.

Carbon auditors CO2balance analysed at every aspect of the operation – from the mileage of the transport fleet down to what happens to the office tea bags.

At the time of the audit, the station generated more than 64 tonnes of CO2 each year. On hearing the results the staff voluntarily dipped into their pockets to fund the three main accredited methods of carbon offsetting – tree planting, sustainable projects and carbon trading. On average the cost to each member of staff was between £25 and £50, depending on their salary. Staff also looked at all areas where pollution is generated to reduce the station's carbon footprint and make it more environmentally friendly. These included:

 The fleet of cars for reporters were swapped for fuel-efficient vans.
 Lighting systems were replaced with more energy-efficient ones.
 Loft insulation was improved and double glazing was considered.
 The electricity and paper supplies were checked to make sure they are eco-friendly.
 Water coolers were removed in favour of tap water.
 New recycling measures were introduced.
 Eco-friendly cleaning products were introduced.

Programming
Local programming is produced and broadcast from the BBC's Taunton studios from 6am – 10pm on weekdays and from 6am – 6pm on Saturday and 6am-2pm on Sunday.

Off-peak programming originates from BBC Radio Bristol , BBC Radio Cornwall in Truro and BBC Radio Devon in Plymouth.

During the station's downtime, BBC Radio Somerset simulcasts overnight programming from BBC Radio 5 Live and BBC Radio London.

Presenters

Notable current presenters include:

Simon Parkin (weekday daytime, Saturday breakfast)
Geoff Twentyman

Former presenters

Ben McGrail
Carrie Davis
Fi Glover

Awards and nominations

References

External links

Somerset
Culture in Somerset
Radio stations in Somerset
Radio stations established in 1988